Rubberman: Up, Up and Away is a 1996 Philippine comedy superhero film directed by Edgardo Vinarao. The film stars Michael V. as the title role. It was one of the entries in the 1996 Metro Manila Film Festival.

Cast
Main cast
 Michael V. as Bitoy / Rubberman
 Beth Tamayo as Jessica
 Gloria Romero as Madam Rita
 Dick Israel as Val Balbin / Mandreko
 Roy Alvarez as Yoyoy
 Allan K. as Baldo
 Bomber Moran as Bobo
 Archie Adamos as Video Guy
 Nathan Torres as Henry
 Tootsie Guevara as Carissa
 Tonee Arao as Tonee
 Randel Gayoso as Jeff
 Dina Cementina as Carnival Manager
 Princess Ann Schuck as Little Jessica
 Emman Abeleda as Younger Brother

Guest cast
 Ian Veneracion as Policeman
 Jennifer Mendoza as TV Reporter
 Lara Morena  as Roller Blade Girl
 Jun Limpot as himself
 Vergel Meneses as herself
 Aster Amoyo as herself

References

External links

1996 films
1996 action comedy films
Filipino-language films
GMA Pictures films
OctoArts Films films
Philippine action comedy films
Philippine fantasy comedy films
Philippine superhero films